Pilley is a village in the metropolitan borough of Barnsley in South Yorkshire, England.

Pilley is situated to the south of Barnsley and to the west of Junction 36 of the M1 motorway.  It is part of the civil parish of Tankersley, and lies close to that village. The general store in Pilley also serves as Tankersley Post Office.

It has a small Church of England church of St Paul and a Wesleyan Church dating from 1886.

See also
Listed buildings in Tankersley, South Yorkshire

External links 

Tankersley Parish Council

Villages in South Yorkshire